Magnet was an children's programming block aimed to preteens that aired on HBO Family. It first aired on August 26, 2001 alongside Jam, a block made for preschoolers. Until 2004, the block aired on afternoons and evenings at 5pm to 7pm every day.

History 
In August 2001, HBO announced the blocks Jam and Magnet for their family channel, HBO Family, both of which first began on August 26, 2001. Magnet's initial programming lineup was 30 by 30: Kid Flicks, Animated Tales of The World, Crashbox, Dear America, and The Worst Witch. Later on, Jam and HBO Family's programming were added on Magnet's lineup like The Little Lulu Show, Freshman Year, and What Matters.

In 2004, the block moved its timeslot to 1:30pm and runs until 3:30pm. When this happened, some of the programming was dropped and was replaced with a full hour of Crashbox. Also during this time, Happily Ever After: Fairy Tales for Every Child moved its place from Jam to Magnet. The only show that survived this change was The Little Lulu Show, a show that also aired on Jam. By late 2004, the block dropped its own branding, leaving it unbranded. In June 2005, the block was entirely removed from HBO Family's lineup. As a result, Animated Tales of the World and Crashbox moved to Jam; while the former did not last long there, the latter still airs to this day, as Jam is now known as HBO Kids. This also caused Happily Ever After: Fairy Tales for Every Child to move back to Jam permanently.

Programming

Shows 
 A History of US
 30 by 30: Kid Flicks (August 26, 2001 – 2004)
 Animated Tales of The World
 Crashbox (August 26, 2001 – 2005)
 Dear America
 Freshman Year
 Happily Ever After: Fairy Tales for Every Child (2004–05)
 The Adventures of Tintin
 The Little Lulu Show (2002–05)
 The Worst Witch (August 27, 2001 – 2004)
 What Matters

Short-form programming 
 30 by 30: Short Spots
 Buzzwatt
 Frog Blues
 HBO Family: 411
 The Booth in The Back
 The Way I See It
 Yuk

References 

HBO original programming
Television programming blocks
Television channels and stations established in 2001
Television channels and stations disestablished in 2005